There are multiple places called Sidi Slimane in Algeria:
Sidi Slimane, El Oued, a village in Bayadha Commune, El Oued Province
Sidi Slimane, Ouargla, a town in Ouargla Province
Sidi Slimane, Tissemsilt, a town in Tissemsilt Province